ZZ is a Japanese band.

Members 

 Sotaro (vocals)
 Erichi (keyboards)
 Matsuura (drums)
 Kohsuke (guitarist)
 Kyama (bassist)
 Rey (Guitarist)

Discography

Albums 
 Definitive Energy Flow (2003)
 Universal ZZ (2004)
 A to ZZ - Complete Single Collection (CD and DVD) (2004)
 Generation Hip Innocence (2005)
 ZZB (2005)
 A to ZZ2 (2007)

Singles 
2003
 "No Way Out"
 "Rhythmist"
 ""
 "A to Z (Normal Edition)"
2004
 "Nobody Knows2"
 "Pride Yourself"
 "Just Only One/Samurai Crew"
2005
 "Samurai Crew"
2006
 "" - Song done in support of the Japan national football team. The team's nickname is Samurai Blue.

References 
 Official homepage
 ZZ profiles

External links 
ZZ Self Report of concerts in San Jose and Toronto 
ZZ database — Upcoming informations 
REPORT:ZZ Self Report of concerts in San Jose and Toronto

Avex Group artists
Japanese rock music groups
Musical groups established in 2003
Musical groups from Shizuoka Prefecture